The 2014 Cuyahoga County Council election was held on November 4, 2014 to elect members of the County Council of Cuyahoga County, Ohio. Odd-numbered districts were up for election to four-year terms, while District 10 held a special election after the resignation of Julian Rogers in 2013 to fill out the remainder of his term.

Republicans defended both of their seats up for election, while Democrats defended all 5 of theirs, maintaining the partisan balance in the chamber.

After the retirement of Council President C. Ellen Connally, District 3 Councilman Dan Brady was elected to the Council Presidency.

District 1

Democratic primary

Primary results

Republican primary

Primary results

General election

Results

District 3

Democratic primary

Primary results

General election

Results

District 5

Republican primary

Primary results

General election

Results

District 7

Democratic primary

Primary results

General election

Results

District 9

Democratic primary

Primary results

Republican primary

Primary results

General election

Results

District 10

General election

Results

District 11

Democratic primary

Primary results

Republican primary

Primary results

General election

Results

References

Cuyahoga County Council
Cuyahoga County Council
2014 Council
Cuyahoga County Council